Candlewood Shores is a private residential community and census-designated place (CDP) in the town of Brookfield, Fairfield County, Connecticut, United States. It is in the northwest part of the town, on the east shore of Candlewood Lake. It is bordered to the south by Candlewood Orchrads, to the north by Candlewood Lake Club, and to the west by the town of New Fairfield.

Candlewood Shores was first listed as a CDP prior to the 2020 census.

References

External links
Candlewood Shores official website

Census-designated places in Fairfield County, Connecticut
Census-designated places in Connecticut